is a Japanese racing driver who is currently competing for Toyota Gazoo Racing in the FIA World Endurance Championship and Japanese Super Formula Championship. He was Super GT GT500 champion in 2017, and finished runner-up in Super Formula in 2020. He won the 24 Hours of Le Mans and the Hypercar World Endurance Drivers' Championship in 2022 alongside co-drivers Sébastien Buemi and Brendon Hartley.

Early career
Born in Kure, Hiroshima Prefecture, Hirakawa began his racing career in karting at the age of thirteen and raced in various local championships. In just his second year of karting, he won the 2008 All-Japan Junior Kart Championship, before progressing to the KF2 category in 2009, where he finished third in the All-Japan Kart Championship and 32nd in the Asia-Pacific Championship.

After graduating from the Formula Toyota Racing School, Hirakawa graduated to single-seaters in 2010, competing primarily in the Formula Challenge Japan series. In his first season, he finished sixth in the series standings, finishing on the podium two times in eleven races. He won his first race in the Super FJ category, and won the JAF Regional Championship Super FJ Okayama Series title at 16 years, 8 months of age. Hirakawa also contested the final three rounds in the 2010 Formula BMW Pacific season, as a guest driver. He recorded a best finish of fourth place at Okayama. 

He remained in Formula Challenge Japan for 2011, winning his first race in the sixth round at Fuji Speedway. He finished the year second in the championship standings behind future Toyota Gazoo Racing WRT driver Takamoto Katsuta. That same year, Hirakawa won the JAF Formula 4 West Series Championship, becoming the youngest champion at 17 years, 8 months of age.

In 2012, Hirakawa competed for a third season in Formula Challenge Japan, and simultaneously stepped up to the All-Japan Formula Three Championship with Team RSS, as well as the Porsche Carrera Cup Japan with a Porsche junior scholarship. 

He won his debut race in Japanese F3, and seven of the first nine races of the season, en route to clinching the championship at the twelfth round in Sportsland Sugo. After the Japanese F3 season concluded, Hirakawa made his debut in the Macau Grand Prix with RSS, qualifying 24th and retiring from the race due to a collision. In Porsche Carrera Cup Japan, Hirakawa won seven consecutive races, and clinched the series championship with two races remaining. He became the youngest ever champion in Japanese F3 and Carrera Cup Japan, at 18 years of age. And in his third FCJ season, Hirakawa won five races, and finished second in the championship to Nobuharu Matsushita, after both drivers finished with the same number of points and race wins.

Super Formula and Super GT career

Super Formula

2013–2015 
Hirakawa joined the Toyota Young Driver Program (TDP) and made his Super Formula Championship debut in 2013 with the Toyota-powered Team LeMans. At 19 years of age, Hirakawa was the youngest driver in the championship. He finished his debut season 11th in the championship standings, with a best finish of fourth at the double-header finale at Suzuka Circuit. That same year, Hirakawa tested an IndyCar for Dale Coyne Racing at Sonoma Raceway.

In 2014, he scored his first Super Formula podium finish in the 13 July race at Fuji Speedway, finishing second after running off track while leading on the final lap. Kazuki Nakajima claimed the race victory. Hirakawa improved to eighth in the championship. Hirakawa remained at Team LeMans for 2015, joined by ex-Formula One driver Kamui Kobayashi. Hirakawa finished eighth in the championship for the second consecutive season, recording five top eight finishes.

2018–present 

After two seasons away from the series, Hirakawa rejoined the Super Formula grid in 2018, driving for Team Impul alongside Yuhi Sekiguchi. He won his first pole position at the second round in Autopolis, but the race was cancelled due to heavy rain and fog. He went on to record consecutive podium finishes at Motegi and Okayama, and finished a career-best fifth in the drivers' championship. In the fifth round of the 2019 season, Hirakawa scored his first career victory at Motegi. Despite the breakthrough victory, he failed to score points in five out of the first six races, and dropped to tenth in the championship standings.

The start of the 2020 season was delayed until September due to the effects of the COVID-19 pandemic, but Hirakawa won the first race of the season from pole at Motegi. He finished fourth and second in the following races at Okayama and Sugo, respectively, to build an early points lead. But after two consecutive non-scoring results, Hirakawa conceded the points lead, and would finish runner-up in the championship to Naoki Yamamoto by just two points.

Hirakawa failed to win a race in 2021, but scored two second place finishes at Suzuka and finished fourth in the championship, helping Team Impul win the teams' title. He began the 2022 season by winning the opening round at Fuji, and the fourth round at Autopolis. He went on to finish third in the drivers' championship.

Super GT

2014–2016 
Hirakawa made his Super GT debut in 2014 with Lexus team TOM's, substituting for Kazuki Nakajima in the team's No. 36 car for two races as Nakajima fulfilled commitments for Toyota in the World Endurance Championship. He recorded top ten finishes in his two races at Fuji and Autopolis.

He made his full-time debut in 2015 for TOM's, driving the No. 37 KeePer-sponsored car alongside Andrea Caldarelli. He won his first race in just his third career start at Okayama, then won again in the season finale at Motegi. Hirakawa and Caldarelli finished fifth in the championship. Hirakawa would be joined by James Rossiter for the 2016 season. They recorded podium finishes in the first two rounds of the season, but finished ninth in the drivers' championship.

2017–2019 

For 2017, Toyota changed models to the new Lexus LC 500, and Hirakawa was joined at the No. 37 TOM's car by Nick Cassidy. The duo of Hirakawa and Cassidy won the opening round at Okayama, leading an all-Lexus sweep of the top six positions. They won again from pole position in the penultimate round at Chang International Circuit in Thailand, before clinching the GT500 championship with a second place finish at the finale at Motegi. Hirakawa and Cassidy finished the year with four podiums, and a perfect record of eight points-paying finishes. At 23 years of age, both Hirakawa and Cassidy became the youngest GT500 champions in series history, with Hirakawa holding the record for the youngest Japanese born GT500 champion.

Hirakawa and Cassidy would seek to defend their championships in 2018, but faced strong competition from an improved Honda fleet led by Team Kunimitsu and their drivers, Naoki Yamamoto and newcomer Jenson Button. The reigning champions won the penultimate round in Autopolis, but fell short of the championship by three points, as Team Kunimitsu, Yamamoto, and Button won their first titles.

In 2019, Hirakawa and Cassidy once again finished second in the drivers' championship, just two points behind manufacturer stablemates Kazuya Oshima and Kenta Yamashita at Team LeMans. But the No. 37 TOM's crew were able to win the teams' championship by one point over Team LeMans, after another strong season for Hirakawa and Cassidy that saw them win the final round at Motegi, and record another four podium finishes. That same year, Hirakawa appeared at the 2019 DTM season finale at the Hockenheimring, finishing 13th in the weekend's first race. He finished eighth during the second Super GT x DTM Dream Race at Fuji Speedway on 24 November.

2020–21 

The start of the 2020 Super GT season was delayed until July due to the COVID-19 pandemic. Hirakawa and Cassidy won the opening round at Fuji Speedway from pole position, giving the new Toyota GR Supra GT500 a win in its debut race. After retiring from the sixth round at Suzuka due to a pit entry collision, Cassidy left the series in order to focus on his new role as a driver for Envision Virgin Racing in Formula E. Hirakawa and his new co-driver Kenta Yamashita won pole for the final round at Fuji Speedway. They led the majority of the race, with Hirakawa in position to win the championship, but increasingly faced pressure from Naoki Yamamoto in the latter stages of the race. Hirakawa ran out of fuel on the final corner of the final lap, allowing Yamamoto to overtake him to win the race and the championship alongside new Team Kunimitsu co-driver Tadasuke Makino. Hirakawa coasted to a second place finish, and again missed out on a second championship by just two points.

Hirakawa was meant to drive the 2021 season alongside Sacha Fenestraz, but Fenestraz's ongoing visa issues meant that Sena Sakaguchi would drive in his place for the first five rounds. Hirakawa and Sakaguchi finished on the podium in the first two rounds at Okayama and Fuji. Fenestraz returned for the sixth round at Autopolis, and the duo finished second in the final round at Fuji Speedway. Hirakawa finished the year seventh in the drivers' championship.

Prototype career

European Le Mans Series (2016–2017)
On 4 February 2016, Toyota Gazoo Racing announced that Hirakawa would be competing in the LMP2 class of the European Le Mans Series. On 4 March, Hirakawa was confirmed as the third driver at Thiriet by TDS Racing alongside Pierre Thiriet and Mathias Beche. He won his first race in the ELMS at the 2016 4 Hours of Imola on 15 May, then won the following 4 Hours of Red Bull Ring on 17 July. He also competed in the 24 Hours of Le Mans for the first time in 2016, and was in contention for an LMP2 class podium finish before Thiriet suffered an accident early in the morning on Sunday.

For 2017, Hirakawa joined the number 22 G-Drive Racing entry operated by DragonSpeed, partnering Memo Rojas and Léo Roussel. The trio won the second round, the 4 Hours of Monza, on 14 May, and the G-Drive/DragonSpeed team won the LMP2 Teams' championship that season.

FIA World Endurance Championship (2022–present)
On 7 December 2021, Hirakawa was announced as a driver of the #8 Toyota GR010 Hybrid in the 2022 FIA World Endurance Championship. He replaced Kazuki Nakajima, who took on a managerial role at Toyota Gazoo Racing Europe after retiring from driving. In his debut for the factory Hypercar team, Hirakawa scored his first career podium at the 1000 Miles of Sebring. The number 8 Toyota of Hirakawa, Buemi, and Hartley won the pole for the 24 Hours of Le Mans, and would go on to win the race. In his first time challenging for the overall victory, Hirakawa became only the sixth Japanese driver to win a leg of the Triple Crown of Motorsport, succeeding fellow Le Mans winners Masanori Sekiya, Seiji Ara, Kamui Kobayashi, and Nakajima, and Indianapolis 500 winner Takuma Sato.

After finishing second at Monza, winning the 6 Hours of Fuji, and finishing second again in Bahrain, Hirakawa won the Hypercar World Endurance Drivers' Championship. He succeeded Nakajima, Kobayashi, and Toshihiro Arai as the fourth Japanese driver to win an FIA world championship of motorsport. Hirakawa will return to partner Buemi and Hartley in 2023.

Racing record

Career summary

† – As Hirakawa was a guest driver, he was ineligible for points.

‡ Team standings.
* Season still in progress.

Complete Super Formula results
(Races in bold indicate pole position)(Races in italics indicate fastest lap)

Complete Super GT results

Complete European Le Mans Series results

24 Hours of Le Mans results

Complete Deutsche Tourenwagen Masters results

† As Hirakawa was a guest driver, he was ineligible to score championship points.

Complete FIA World Endurance Championship results

* Season still in progress.

References

External links

  
 

1994 births
Living people
Sportspeople from Hiroshima Prefecture
Japanese racing drivers
Formula BMW Pacific drivers
Japanese Formula 3 Championship drivers
Super Formula drivers
Formula Challenge Japan drivers
Super GT drivers
24 Hours of Le Mans drivers
European Le Mans Series drivers
Deutsche Tourenwagen Masters drivers
FIA World Endurance Championship drivers
Asia Racing Team drivers
KCMG drivers
Team LeMans drivers
TOM'S drivers
TDS Racing drivers
G-Drive Racing drivers
Toyota Gazoo Racing drivers
DragonSpeed drivers